Pure International Ltd. is a British consumer electronics company, based in Kings Langley, Hertfordshire, founded in 2002. They are best known for designing and manufacturing digital audio broadcasting (DAB) and DAB+ radios.  The imprint on the devices' casing states that they were designed in the UK and manufactured in China.

Pure have sold over five million products worldwide. All products are digital tick approved, with three years' warranty as standard. Pure is also a member of World DAB

Pure products are available in the United Kingdom, Australia, Denmark, France, Germany, Ireland, Italy, Netherlands, Norway and Switzerland, and via online suppliers.

History 
2002

Pure was formerly a division of another Hertfordshire-based company, Imagination Technologies, which primarily designs Central processing units and Graphics processing units. Imagination did not originally set out to sell consumer electronics and the first Pure radio was merely a demonstration platform for its DAB decoding chip. The success of the first sub-£100 DAB receiver, the Evoke-1, led to the development of further products.

2003

In 2003, Pure launched the PocketDAB 1000. It was the world's first pocket digital radio.

2004

Pure released the Bug, the first-ever digital radio with EPG, pause, rewind and record.

2005

Sonus-1XT was launched by Pure and became the world's first digital radio for the blind and visually impaired.

2007

Pure released Highway, the world's first in-car digital radio adapter, in 2007.

2008

Pure launched the first Energy Saving Trust approved radio range. Under the name EcoPlus, products had reduced power consumption, packaging materials from recycled and sustainable sources and components selected to minimise their environmental impact.

2009

The world's first high-resolution touchscreen digital radio, Sensia, is launched by Pure.

2012

Pure celebrated its tenth anniversary in 2012 with a brand revamp. They also commemorated the landmark with the launch of the Evoke Mio Union Jack Edition.

2013

Pure partners with renowned classical music label, Deutsche Grammophon.

2014

Pure introduced its three-year warranty.

2015

Pure shipped in excess of five million digital radios worldwide positioning itself as the best-selling digital radio manufacturer.

2016

Pure became Pure International Ltd.
Parent company Imagination Technologies sold the Pure brand to AVenture AT, in September 2016.

Products
Evoke range

Pure's flagship family of digital radios. Models range from medium to high-end and include multi-functional music systems which offer listening via internet radio, Spotify, Bluetooth and CD.

This range has included collaborations with designer brands such as Sanderson and Mini Moderns. Its first designer styled radio came in 2010 with the launch of the Evoke Mio by Orla Kiely. It featured the designer's signature stem print.

In 2006, Pure joined forces with recognised English company Marshall Amplification to launch the Evoke-1XT Marshall. Models of the radio were signed by rock stars including Eric Clapton, Oasis and Paul Weller and auctioned for the Nordoff-Robins music therapy charity.

One range

The One range represents Pure's entry-level radios and is the world's best-selling digital radio range. Models include: the One Mini, One Midi and One Maxi. Designed for portability, they can be powered with AA batteries or an optional rechargeable ChargePAK.

Pop range

A series of digital radios designed with portability in mind. All models can be powered with AA batteries or an optional rechargeable ChargePAK. Designed with a pop button on top of the device, users can control power and volume with one touch. Recent models in the range include Bluetooth for wireless audio streaming.

Highway range

Pure's series of in-car digital radio adapters. Current models Highway 400 and Highway 600 work with a vehicle's existing audio system using an aux-in cable or by transmitting over an unused FM radio frequency.

On top of digital radio, users can listen via Bluetooth and Spotify Connect. The Highway's Go function allows for music discovery, track tagging (Powered by ACRCloud) and wireless playing with the Pure Go companion app.

Siesta range

Pure's range of bedside alarm clock radios, which enable users to wake up to the sound of digital radio or a simple tone alarm. Siesta models automatically set the time from the radio signal, meaning the device's clock is always accurate.

Other

Other models are the portable, colour screen Elan E3 digital radio and the pocket-sized Move 2500 personal radio.

References

External links

 Pure company website

Audio equipment manufacturers of the United States
Electronics companies established in 2002
Companies based in Three Rivers District
British brands
Manufacturing companies of the United Kingdom
2002 establishments in England
Radio manufacturers